The following is a timeline of the history of the city of Grozny, Chechen Republic, Russia.

Prior to 20th century

 1819 – Groznaya fort built by Russian Aleksey Petrovich Yermolov.
 1870 – Grozny granted town status in Terek Oblast.
 1876 – Population: 6,000 (approximate).
 1893 – Oil discovered in Grozny area.
 1897 – Population: 15,599.
 1900 – Synagogue opens.

20th century

 1913 – Population: 34,067.
 1917 – Groznensky Rabochy newspaper begins publication.
 1926 – Population: 97,000.
 1928 – Grozny–Tuapse oil pipeline launched.
 1929 – City becomes capital of the Chechen Autonomous Oblast.
 1932 – Electric tramway begins operating.
 1936 – Chechen-Ingush Philharmonic Society active.
 1937 – Grozny Music College opens.
 1938 – Grozny University founded.
 1939 – Population: 175,000.
 1944 – Vainakh people in North Caucasus expelled.
 1946 – Stadium built.
 1958 – August: 1958 Grozny riots.
 1965 – Population: 314,000.
 1973 – January: Ingush demonstrations at Lenin Square.
 1977 – Grozny Airport terminal built.
 1980 – Chechen State Teacher Training College founded.
 1985 – Population: 393,000.
 1991
 City becomes capital of the Chechen Republic of Ichkeria.
 Beslan Gantemirov becomes mayor.
 Lenin Square renamed "Sheikh Mansur Square."
 9 November: Pro-Chechnya demonstration at Freedom Square.
 1993 – 15 April: Demonstration against Dzhokhar Dudayev.
 1994
 13 June: Conflict.
 15 October: "Opposition forces attack" city.
 26–27 November: Battle of Grozny.
 28 December: Battle of Khankala occurs near city.
 31 December: Battle of Grozny (1994–95) begins.
 Population: 370,000 (estimate).
 1995
 January: Battle of Grozny.
 19 January: Presidential Palace captured by Russian forces.
 Population: 60,000 (approximate).
 1996
 Presidential Palace, Grozny demolished.
 May: Conflict.
 6–20 August: Battle of Grozny.
 Mayor Beslan Gantemirov arrested for embezzlement.
 Islamic Youth Centre opens (approximate date).
 1997
 City renamed "Dzokhar-Ghala."
 June: Mayoral election declared invalid.
 1999
 1999 Russian bombing of Chechnya.
 21 October: Grozny ballistic missile attack.
 3 December: Refugee convoy shooting occurs near city.
 25 December: Battle of Grozny (1999–2000) begins.
 2000
 30 January: Mayor Lecha Dudayev killed.
 February: Russian forces take city.
 5 February: Novye Aldi massacre occurs near city.
 14 February: City "sealed."
 2 March: Grozny OMON fratricide incident.
 April: Land mines cleared; civilians begin returning to city.
 Grozneftegaz oil company headquartered in Grozny.

21st century

 2001 – 17 September: Mi-8 crash.
 2002
 18 April: 2002 Grozny OMON ambush.
 30 June: Peace rally at Teatralnaya Square.
 19 August: 2002 Khankala Mi-26 crash near city.
 27 December: Truck bombing.
 Population: 205,000.
 2003 – Movsar Temirbayev becomes mayor.
 2004
 9 May: Explosion at stadium; Akhmad Kadyrov killed.
 21–22 August: 2004 Grozny raid.
 2006 – Population: 240,000 (estimate).
 2007 – Muslim Khuchiyev becomes mayor.
 2008
 Akhmad Kadyrov Mosque opens.
 11 October: The 5.8  Chechnya earthquake shook the area with a maximum Mercalli intensity of VII (Very strong). Damage was limited in Grozny, but 13 were killed and 116 were injured in the districts of Gudermes, Shalinsky and Kurchaloyevsky.
 Victory Avenue renamed "Putin Avenue."
 2010
 19 October: Chechen Parliament attack.
 Population: 271,600 (estimate).
 2011 – Grozny-City Towers and Terek Stadium built.
 2012
 Islam Kadyrov becomes mayor.
 Lermontov Drama Theatre rebuilt.
 2013 – 3 April: Fire in Olympus Tower.
 2014 – 4 December: 2014 Grozny clashes.
 2015 – March: Rally in support of the annexation of Crimea by the Russian Federation.

See also
 Grozny history (ru)
 Administrative divisions of Chechnya
 Other names of Grozny
 Timelines of other cities in the North Caucasian Federal District of Russia: Makhachkala

References

This article incorporates information from the Russian Wikipedia.

Bibliography

Published in 19th–20th centuries
 
 
 

Published in 21st century

External links

  (photos of city)
 

 
grozny
Years in Russia